The Raleigh Fire Department (RFD) provides fire protection and  emergency medical services to the city of Raleigh, North Carolina.

Stations and apparatus 

, below is a complete listing of all facilities and apparatus locations in the City of Raleigh.

Gallery

References

Fire departments in North Carolina
Fire